Tor Egil Kreken (born 30 March 1977 in Norway) is a Norwegian musician (bass, banjo, guitars).

Biography 
Kreken plays within the bands Eivind Aarset Trio (bass), Faircastle Four (guitar, banjo), Shining (bass), The Holstein United Bluegrass Boys (banjo, vocal)
Wibutee (bass, banjo) and Darling West (guitar, banjo, vocal).

Honors 
2013: Received the Statoil scholarship within the band Shining, at By:larm in Oslo

Discography 

With Maria Solheim
2002: Behind Closed Doors (Kirkelig Kulturverksted)
2004: Frail (Kirkelig Kulturverksted)
2006: Will There Be Spring? (Kirkelig Kulturverksted)

Within Wibutee
2006: Sweet Mental (Sonne Music), feat. Anja Garbarek

With Sternklang
2006: Transistor Beach

With Eivind Aarset
2007: Sonic Codex (Jazzland Recordings)

With Maria Arredondo
2007: For a Moment (Mountain Music)

Within Garness
2008: The Good Or Better Side of Things (Kirkelig Kulturverksted)
2009: Barnet I Krybben (Plush Badger Music)

Within Grand Telemark
2008: Grand Telemark (Sonne)

Within Shining
2010: Blackjazz (Indie Recordings)
2011: Live Blackjazz (Indie Recordings)
2013: One One One (Indie Recordings)
2015: International Blackjazz Society (Spinefarm Records)

With Hellbillies
2010: Leite Etter Lykka (EMI Norge)

With Haddy N'jie
2010: World of the Free (Trust Me Records)

With Maria Mena
2011: Viktoria (Columbia)

With Marit Larsen
2011: Spark (EMI Norge)

With other projects
2005: Down Like a Dog (Grand Slam Happy Time), Tor Konstalij
2008: Sådagen (Etnisk Musikklubb), with Eilif Gundersen
2009: Markblomster Og Potteplanter (POLselection), with Dennis Storhøi, Hilde Norland Gundersen, Espen Gjelstad Gundersen & Frøydis Grorud
2010: Tomorrow Is (Sony Music), with Christel Alsos
2011: Fatal Fix (2011), Paranoid James
2012: Jeg Har Vel Ingen Kjærere (Plush Badger Music), Anne Gravir Klykken
2013: Tåra, Pess Og Blod'' (Silsand Sild Og Cd), Senjahopen ("Gamlingen")

References

External links
 Wibutee Official website

1977 births
Living people
Norwegian jazz bass guitarists
Norwegian male bass guitarists
Norwegian jazz guitarists
21st-century Norwegian bass guitarists
21st-century Norwegian male musicians
Male jazz musicians
Wibutee members
Shining (Norwegian band) members